Sofia Cabrera (born 27 June 1997) is a Guatemalan modern pentathlete.

She participated at the 2018 World Modern Pentathlon Championships, winning a medal.

References

External links

1997 births
Living people
Guatemalan female modern pentathletes
World Modern Pentathlon Championships medalists
Central American and Caribbean Games gold medalists for Guatemala
Central American and Caribbean Games silver medalists for Guatemala
Competitors at the 2018 Central American and Caribbean Games
Central American and Caribbean Games medalists in modern pentathlon
20th-century Guatemalan women
21st-century Guatemalan women